During the 1982–83 English football season, Charlton Athletic F.C. competed in the Football League Second Division.

Season summary
Charlton stunned the footballing world when they saw off competition from Real Madrid and Tottenham Hotspur to sign Danish striker Allan Simonsen, the European Footballer of the Year only 5 years earlier, from Spanish giants Barcelona. The club had hopes of regaining promotion to the First Division, but things went horribly wrong for Charlton. Barcelona wanted the money from the transfer of Simonsen up-front, and demanded bank guarantees of £100,000, delaying Simonsen's debut by six weeks. By February, the Addicks were nearly bankrupt and facing relegation. Simonsen left in March after 9 goals in 16 games, and Charlton only survived relegation with a last-day win.

Chairman Mark Hulyer had to reach an agreement with the Inland Revenue in the summer over a £145,000 tax bill, and also faced both a petition for bankruptcy from former chairman Michael Gliksten and a winding-up order from creditors Leeds. Goalkeeper Nicky Johns was voted the club's Player of the Season.

Kit
German company Adidas remained Charlton's kit manufacturers. No kit sponsor was found for the team's kits during the season.

Squad

Left club during season

Transfers

In
  Allan Simonsen -  Barcelona, £300,000, October

Results

Second Division

November
 Middlesbrough 3-2 Charlton Athletic

References

Charlton Athletic F.C. seasons
Charlton Athletic F.C.